This is a list of songs which received the most airplay per week on radio stations in the United States as ranked and published by Billboard magazine on the Radio Songs (formerly Hot 100 Airplay) chart during the 2020s.

Number-one airplay hits

Songs by total number of weeks at number one
The following songs were featured at the top of the Radio Songs chart for the highest number of weeks during the 2020s.

See also 
2020 in American music
List of Billboard Hot 100 number-one singles of the 2020s

References

External links
Current Radio Songs chart

United States Radio Songs
Billboard charts
Radio Songs 2020s
2020s in American music